Salsa roja is a type of spicy red sauce in Mexican cuisine. It is made of jitomate (red tomato), ground with onion, garlic, chilli, salt and pepper to taste.

This red sauce comes in subtypes: salsa cocida ("cooked sauce"), in which the ingredients are cooked (e.g. by stewing) and then ground; salsa asada ("roasted sauce"), in which the elements are roasted on a comal and then ground; salsa cruda ("raw sauce"), in which ingredients are ground raw, ready to eat; and a combination in which some elements are roasted and other cooked. A molcajete or a blender can be used for the grinding process. After the sauce is prepared, it can be cooked again in a pan with little oil.

It is used to prepare traditional Mexican foods, in a mild spicy level for enchiladas and huevos rancheros, or spicier for antojitos such as tacos and quesadillas.

See also
 Chili sauce
 Salsa verde
 Pico de gallo
 List of sauces

References
Rick Bayless Mexico One Plate At A Time. (2000). 
Muñoz Zurita, Ricardo. (2013) Pequeño Larousee de la Gastronomía Mexicana. 

Chili pepper dishes
Sauces
Mexican cuisine